Floor slip resistance testing is the science of measuring the coefficient of friction (or resistance to slip accidents) of flooring surfaces, either in a laboratory (before or after installation) or on floors in situ. Slip resistance testing (or floor friction testing) is usually desired by the building's owner or manager when there has been a report of a slip and fall accident, when there has been a report of a near accident, or (preferably) before the flooring is installed on the property. Flooring is tested using a tribometer (floor slip resistance tester) to discover if there is a high propensity for slip and fall accidents on it, either dry and/or (most often) when wet with water or lubricated with other contaminants such as kitchen grease, hydraulic oil, etc. There have been numerous floor slip resistance testing tribometers and lab devices produced around the world to measure both the static (stationary) and dynamic (in motion) coefficient of friction, but presently there are only a few that have been proven to be reliable for obtaining useful safety results and that have current official test methods. Static coefficient of friction (SCOF) testing has always been unreliable for assessing safety in the wet condition, so any reliable slip resistance test will be measuring the available slip resistance to someone who is moving (dynamic) across the floor, and therefore will be assessing dynamic coefficient of friction (DCOF). If an instrument has no official published test method, or has a withdrawn (or historical) test method, then there is a problem with the instrument, often being poor precision.

To assess a floor's slip resistance, a reliable, thoroughly researched (in interlaboratory studies) floor friction test method must be used, and then a minimum safety criterion (0.42, 0.60, 36, etc.) is needed to apply to the results. Each different slip test device will have its own safety criterion. If the floor is likely to be lubricated with water or grease in use, it needs to be anti-slip under these expected conditions. Floor slip resistance testing can be carried out dry, wet with water, or lubricated with oils and other contaminants. Dry slip resistance is not an indicator of wet slip resistance — in fact the two often vary inversely — so reliable wet slip resistance testing is often needed as well as reliable dry testing.

Test methods and safety criteria

Pendulum slip resistance tester 
 The ASTM E303-22 (United States), BS EN 16165:2021, BS EN 13036-4:2011 (United Kingdom and many other European nations), AS 4663:2013 - Slip resistance of existing pedestrian surfaces, and AS 4586:2013 - Slip resistance classification of new pedestrian surface materials (Australia/New Zealand) slip resistance test standards define the pendulum tester that is now a national standard for pedestrian slip resistance in at least 50 nations on five continents and has been endorsed by Ceramic Tile Institute of America since 2001. It is the most widely used pedestrian slip resistance test method worldwide. It has passed the ASTM F2508 in published studies (see BOT-3000E section for more information on F2508). The pendulum uses a standardized piece of rubber (Four S rubber, also known as Slider 96, or "Standard Shoe Sole Simulating" rubber), which is set up to travel across the flooring sample for 123-125mm, mounted onto the pendulum foot. When the arm of the pendulum is set up to miss the flooring completely, the arm swings up to parallel from where it started, and the pointer (brought along by the arm holding the rubber slider) reads zero. Slippery flooring produces readings close to zero, and flooring which show higher resistance to slipping give results further from zero—high numbers (such as those 36 and above) indicating suitable slip resistant flooring.

The United Kingdom has since 1971 had well-established slip resistance standards based on the pendulum, or British Pendulum as it is sometimes referred to as. This test was developed for pedestrian traction by the U.S. National Bureau of Standards in the 1940s and further refined in the UK. It was validated for pedestrian traction in 1971, together with its safety standards, in the UK over a period of 25 years by 3500 real-world public walking area tests and site accident records. The test is an ASTM standard (ASTM E303-22), which in 2022 was updated to describe testing for floors, as well as skid resistance testing for roads. The usual safety standard for a level floor is a minimum Pendulum Test Value (PTV) of 36. The pendulum is also the instrument used in the Sustainable Slip Resistance test method, which measures the possible impact of years of use on a potential flooring's slip resistance. The pendulum has been used in the U.S. and elsewhere for determining the slipperiness of airport runways and basketball courts with other ASTM standards, but is extremely rare with other much easier-to-use meters.

Standards Australia HB 197:1999 as well as Standards Australia HB 198:2014 give detailed recommendations/guidelines of minimum wet Pendulum Test Slip Resistance Values for many different situations in AS 4586-2013: e.g. external ramps, 54; external walkways and pedestrian crossings, 45; shopping center food courts, 35; and elevator lobbies above external entry level may be 25 or less. There are also barefoot area recommendations based on pendulum tests with a soft rubber slider (TRL rubber, also known as Slider 55). The Australian recommendations are presently the world's most detailed standards for pedestrian wet slip resistance. With the recent updates to ASTM E303-93 in 2022 and the European (and United Kingdom's) pendulum test standard BS EN 16165 in 2021, the world's pendulum test methods are very similar in their methods and precision, meaning we can use the safety criteria (see link at the bottom of the page) developed from decades of research around the world.

ASM 925 slip tester
The most portable DCOF Slip Resistance Tester.  The ASM 925 DCOF meter follows our philosophy of a developing tribometers or slip meters. It is smaller, lighter and easier to use than other DCOF devices.
The Inter laboratory Study thru the National Floor Safety Institute and have passed and are listed as an NFSI approved device for dynamic coefficient of friction testing. The 925 performs testing to the NFSI B101.3 standards as well as the ANSI A326.3 standard as an equivalent device. 

The meter ships as a complete kit with everything need to get started including a hard shell roller carrying case.The meter tests to the industry standards for DCOF and is designed to reduce or remove the variables between different operators using the equipment.

BOT-3000E slip tester
This tester can be a valuable tool for property owners and others who need quick DCOF measurements by personnel who have little or no training in floor slip resistance testing, but it should never be used to assess whether a flooring is appropriate for use in areas that are likely to get wet in use. The latest test method, ANSI A326.3, clearly states that one page one of the test method where it says the BOT-3000E "can provide a useful comparison of surfaces, but does not predict the likelihood a person will or will not slip on a hard surface flooring material.”

Although this test method is loosely based on research that was done using the previously active ANSI B101.3 test method, the ANSI A326.3 test method is apparently not based on a correlation to human traction tests or any justifiable level of slip risk. It is a pass/fail test method using the BOT-3000E where any level indoor flooring expected to get wet in use must have a MINIMUM DCOF of 0.42 or greater when wet to be acceptable for use. 

The ANSI A137.1 slip resistance test method preceded ANSI A326.3 and was essentially the same test method. In 2021, ANSI A326.3 was updated to give additional MINIMUM DCOF values for barefoot areas, inclined floors, and outdoor flooring, but many other factors must be considered, according to the test method, and disclaimers within the test method clearly state the minimum DCOF numbers given do not indicate a floor will be considered "safe" when the minimum is met. One of the many disclaimers added to the latest version of the test method states that "the measured DCOF value shall not be the only factor in determining the appropriateness of a hard surface flooring material for a particular application.” This means that A326.3 should not be used to assess real-world slip risk, but is rather a useful test method to assess changes in slip resistance due to wear, maintenance practices, and other factors.

The BOT-3000E has passed the ASTM F2508-13  standard published in 2013 called the "Standard Practice for Validation, Calibration, and Certification of Walkway Tribometers Using Reference Surfaces". Although this test is necessary for a tribometer to pass, it is not sufficient in validating a tribometer as indicative of the human traction potential of a walking surface. It has been unreliable as the manufacturer changes the equipment and updates the software.  The ASTM F2508 test is often conducted and interpreted by people who have a vested interest in their tribometer having passed the test. In other words, a tribometer having passed this test should not be solely relied upon in deciding whether a certain tribometer is trustworthy or not. A reliable tribometer will also be able to submit a reasonable precision statement as required by every test standard-publishing agency, such as the ASTM, ANSI, Standards Australia, and British Standards. A tribometer with internationally accepted approval will have been found to correlate well with Variable-Angle ramp tests of human traction (see below) or the pendulum DCOF tester, have an official and/or well-researched test method, and be able to provide a reasonable precision statement. The English XL, Brungraber Mark II, and Mark IIIB (discussed more below) do not fit this criteria as they cannot provide reasonable precision statements for those devices, which are commonly used by full-time expert witnesses, mainly in the USA. These devices either have had their ASTM test methods withdrawn due to a "failure to provide a reasonable precision statement", or they have never been able to get a published ASTM standard due to a lack of precision in interlaboratory studies.

Variable-angle ramp 
The Variable-Angle Ramp is a German-developed method for obtaining pedestrian slip resistance values. Flooring samples are mounted horizontally on the ramp tester and an operator clad in safety boots or bare feet performs a standardized walk up and down the sample while wearing a harness to stop the operator from being injured. The sample is slowly inclined until the operator slips on the surface. The angle at which the subject slips is then recorded. Two operators repeat this test three times and then an average is calculated. The repeatability of this test method was extensively documented. Tests can be performed dry, wet with soapy water and bare feet, wet with oil, etc.

Over 150 safety criteria have been adopted in Germany and Australia for specific situations — swimming pool decks, commercial kitchens, restrooms, etc. based on the variable-angle ramp, but the ramp itself is not readily portable, so this instrument is only for lab testing and is therefore quite limited in its utility. In other words, you can't test your specific floor tiles using this method without ripping part of your floor up and putting it into the ramp tester. However, since it is measuring real human ambulation, it is considered by many to be the most realistic test method in existence, and the results of pendulum and drag-sled meter tests are sometimes compared with results from variable-angle ramp tests to see if the results have a strong correlation. A good correlation with ramp test results can help a slip resistance test device become more widely used and accepted.

SlipAlert slip tester 
SlipAlert is a matchbox car-like tribometer that is designed to mimic the readings of the pendulum. Manufactured in the United Kingdom, it is used for field testing, but is of limited use in a laboratory setting because it requires a long path length of flooring to conduct tests. As it is a proprietary device, it does not have an official American standard test method, but it does have an official test standard in the United Kingdom in BS 8204-6:2008.

The SlipAlert "car" has a rubber slider on its bottom, which slides across the flooring after running down a fixed ramp. If the SlipAlert stops short, then the flooring is slip resistant, but if it slides a long distance then the floor is considered slippery. There is a digital readout on the device that records the maximum distance the SlipAlert has traveled across the flooring, and a safety criterion graph which interprets the results. Tests can be done dry and wet, and extensive research by U.K. and Australian government agencies have resulted in several endorsements of this test device for in situ testing.

Tortus digital tribometer 
The Tortus digital tribometer slip resistance test method is based on a proprietary or patented device, which makes it ineligible to become an ASTM standard. It is produced in the U.K., and is in a category of slip resistance tester devices known as "drag-sled meters", which means that it travels across flooring under its own power at a constant speed with a piece of standardized rubber dragging on the flooring. The amount of friction created by this piece of rubber as it is dragged across the flooring (dry or wet) is recorded and calculated by the machine as it travels a predetermined path length. An average number of dynamic coefficient of friction (DCOF) is calculated by the machine after its run across the flooring has been completed. This is recorded as the "DCOF", or the amount of friction necessary to drag (dynamic meaning "in motion") the standardized rubber across the flooring. High numbers (e.g. above 0.50) indicate that it is difficult for the machine to drag the rubber across the flooring because it is anti-slip, and low numbers (e.g. below 0.50) means that the rubber easily slides across the flooring and is therefore slippery.

The Tortus is now the primary instrument for assessing dry slip resistance in the latest Australian slip test standard - AS4586-2013. It has also been endorsed as a secondary standard by Ceramic Tile Institute of America (CTIOA) since 2001, with the pendulum being the primary standard. The advantage of the Tortus, compared to the pendulum, is that it can perform many slip tests in a short period of time, dry and wet, using both hard and soft rubbers. It is also difficult for the operator to influence the results of the test (unlike some tribometers) since an electronic button is pushed and then the test is run without any further help from the operator. This makes it a credible forensic science device. CTIOA has endorsed a minimum dynamic coefficient of friction for level floors of 0.50 using the Tortus slip resistance test method.

Withdrawn standards and unreliable test methods

ASTM C1028-07 - static coefficient of friction testing 
Safety criteria based solely on static coefficient of friction (SCOF), often used in the U.S. in the past for assessing safety, are too often misleading where flooring gets wet or otherwise lubricated in use. That is why the ASTM C1028 test method was officially withdrawn with no replacement in 2014. In the US, architects and designers generally look for a wet static coefficient of friction of 0.60 or higher by ASTM method C 1028 to assess potential safety for wet areas of level floors. This can give deceptive results, applying “safe” ratings to some flooring samples that are in fact very slippery when wet. The method is now acknowledged by ASTM, Ceramic Tile Institute of America, and Tile Council of North America to be inadequate for assessing slip safety.

See "external links" at the bottom of this page for more information on the inadequacies of the C1028 test. Suffering from stiction and the fact that the measurement taken is a measure of how slippery a surface is when someone is standing still on it (which is irrelevant to the measuring of the slip resistance to a person walking over the surface - where almost every accident occurs), methods such as C1028-07, the James Machine, and the ASM 725/825A should not be used in assessing wet floor friction and should not be relied upon for reliable assessments of wet floor friction safety. These static test methods can be used to monitor changes in slip potential over time, but are not reliable tests for determining slip resistance of flooring. For example, static tests can be conducted before and after a fresh coat of wax is applied to a floor to make sure the SCOF has not changed dramatically with the new wax, or readings can be taken at various times during a business day to make sure that dirt and dust is not making the flooring slip situation worse throughout the day. Monitoring changes in dry SCOF can be a useful practice. However, SCOF tests should never be used to determine if a floor is slippery when wet. The U.S. Occupational Safety and Health Administration (OSHA) has recommended an SCOF of 0.50 for workplace environments, but often flooring having a rating of 0.60 or greater (supposedly even more slip resistant than 0.50 flooring) is proven by reliable test devices (and multiple slip and fall accident victims) to be very, very slippery when wet using this outdated test method. This ASTM test standard has expired, and there are no plans to renew it as it has caused more confusion than anything else.

English XL (VIT), Brungraber Mark I, Brungraber Mark II (PIAST), and Brungraber Mark IIIB 
The former ASTM F1677 was the test method for the Brungraber Mark II (also known as Portable Inclinable Articulated Strut Tribometer or PIAST) device, and the former ASTM F1679 test method was written for the English XL Variable Incidence Tribometer (VIT). Shortly after being published, ASTM withdrew these standards in 2006, with no replacement.  Regarding ASTM F1679, ASTM provides the following 'withdrawn rationale': "Formerly under the jurisdiction of Committee F13 on Pedestrian/Walkway Safety and Footwear, this test method was withdrawn as an active ASTM standard by action of the Committee of Standards (COS) on September 30, 2006 for failure to include an approved precision statement (violating Section A21 of the Form and Style for ASTM Standards), and for including reference to proprietary apparatus where alternatives exist (violating Section 15 of the Regulations Governing ASTM Technical Committees)." ASTM offers the following, similar 'withdrawn rationale' for F1677: "Formerly under the jurisdiction of Committee F13 on Pedestrian/Walkway Safety and Footwear, this test method was withdrawn as an active ASTM standard by action of the Committee of Standards (COS) on September 30, 2006 for failure to include an approved precision statement (violating Section A21 of the Form and Style for ASTM Standards), and for including reference to proprietary apparatus where alternatives exist (violating Section 15 of the Regulations Governing ASTM Technical Committees)."   Using these two instruments, different test labs got very different answers on identical tiles in interlaboratory studies, meaning these test methods (or devices) were unreliable and unable to provide "reasonable precision statements". The Mark IIIB is similar to the Mark II and suffers from the same poor precision issues as its predecessor. The ASTM website now shows that F1677 and F1679 as "historical" standards, meaning they are no longer active and should not be used to assess floor safety.

Users of the English XL and the Brungraber Mark IIIB have, in recent years, begun citing that their instruments are now able to pass ASTM F2508, claiming this makes their instrument "validated" for investigating slips and falls. But as noted earlier, an instrument must be able to pass ASTM F2508, but must also be able to provide a "reasonable precision statement" required from all standards publishing agencies. Instruments that are able to accomplish both of these requirements will have international acceptance and will have published standards in one or more countries. The pendulum and the SlipAlert (now known as iAlert) are two instruments that have active standards and have achieved international acceptance as valid slip testing devices. The English XL and Brungraber Mark IIIB instruments do not have published test standards in any country, and are only very popular with full-time American "expert" witnesses, who have found that they can easily manipulate these devices to get whatever answer a particular lawyer is paying them to get. 

ASTM F462 was withdrawn by the ASTM in 2016, and was for use with the Brungraber Mark I for testing bathtubs. This poorly written standard using junk science helped the sellers of slippery bathtubs for decades before the standard was withdrawn.

ASTM D2047 and the James Machine 

ASTM D2047 is an active standard which involves the "use of the James Machine for the measurement of the static coefficient of friction of polish-coated flooring surfaces", but the "test method is not intended for use on 'wet' surfaces." So this test is for measuring polishes (originally intended to measure floor waxes) that go on top of floors, not for measuring floors. Many flooring manufacturers like to ignore that fact because the test will give a passing grade to virtually any floor on earth, slippery or not. D2047 is a lab test done on a clean and dry surface, where no slip and fall accident has occurred ever. There has to be some sort of contaminant for a floor to be slippery. The test method is a static test, so it is measuring how slippery a floor is to someone who is standing still (static) on it. So, sadly, this test method determines if a floor is slippery to a person who is standing still on a floor, and the floor is clean and dry. This means that this test method will very likely not say any floor on earth is slippery, which makes it a popular test with flooring manufacturing companies who want to give their customers misleading safety data to help sell slippery flooring.

ANSI/NFSI B101.1 and ANSI/NFSI B101.3 

These two test methods were originally published by ANSI for use with the BOT-3000E device discussed above. ANSI B101.1 was another static coefficient of friction (SCOF) test, which is valid for assessing wet pedestrian slip risk. It is still sold as a historical standard, but should not be only used to assess slip risk. Similarly, ANSI B101.3 was also allowed to expire five years after it was published by ANSI, in 2017. The manufacturer of the BOT-3000E device used in these tests no longer endorses the use of these two test methods,.

References

External links
 Safety criteria for pendulum DCOF testing
 Video demonstration of Slip Test Devices on YouTube
 C1028-07 test: More information on the inadequacies of C1028-07 static test
 Slip Test Instruments - several video demonstrations
 More information on the ANSI A137.1 tile slip test in the 2012 IBC

Tests